This is a list of people awarded the title Hero of the Soviet Union who were Uzbek.

 Samig Abdullayev ru
 Urinboy Abdullayev ru
 Soli Adashev ru
 Ruzi Azimov ru
 Sadyk Alinazarov ru
 Hallok Aminov ru
 Turgun Akhmedov ru
 Tukhtasin Akhmedov ru
 Botir Boboyev ru
 Tojiali Boboyev ru
 Tukhtasin Boboyev ru
 Abdusalim Dehqonboyev ru
 Qochqar Durdiyev ru
 Sharif Ergashev ru
 Tuychi Erdzhigitov ru
 Mikhail Fayazov ru
 Nematjon Hakimov ru
 Muydin Hasanov ru
 Ernafas Hojayev ru
 Jumaniyaz Hudaybergenov ru
 Ziyamat Husanov ru
 Sapar Hushnazarov ru
 Bois Irgashev ru
 Kurbanbai Irisbekov ru
 Yuri Islamov ru
 Ishankul Ismailov ru
 Abdusattar Ishankulov ru
 Tashmamat Jumaboyev ru
 Kamol Jamolov ru
 Orozboy Jumaniyozov ru
 Ochil Kadyrov
 Elboy Qoraboyev ru
 Gulyam Karimov ru
 Kuchkar Karshiev ru
 Saydusman Kasymhojaev ru
 Aleksey Kurbanov ru
 Ahmedjan Kurbanov ru
 Sulgi Lutfullin ru
 Jura Mahmudov ru
 Ravshan Mahmudov ru
 Nabijan Minboyev ru
 Vali Nabiev ru
 Inayat Nauruzboyev ru
 Pirimqul Nurmonov ru
 Satym Nurmetov ru
 Abdusattar Rakhimov ru
 Sobir Rakhimov
 Tashtemir Rustemov ru
 Botobay Sadykov ru
 Ahmedjan Shukurov ru
 Kudrat Suyunov ru
 Mamadali Topvaldyev ru
 Jurakul Turoyev ru
 Ablakul Uzakov ru
 Solih Umarov ru
 Shadman Umarov ru
 Muhitdin Umurdinov ru
 Ilyas Urazov ru
 Chutak Urazov ru
 Jurazan Usmanov ru
 Islam Usmanov ru
 Urumbek Yakibov ru
 Gulyam Yakubov ru
 Kasim Yakubov ru
 Abdullaazis Yuldashev ru
 Fayzulla Yuldashev ru

References 

 
 Russian Ministry of Defence Database «Подвиг Народа в Великой Отечественной войне 1941—1945 гг.» [Feat of the People in the Great Patriotic War 1941-1945] (in Russian).

Heroes of the Soviet Union lists